Hypotrix ocularis  is a moth of the family Noctuidae. It is found from south-western New Mexico and south-eastern Arizona southward to Mexico City.

The length of the forewings is 14–16 mm. Adults are on wing in June.

Etymology
The name of this species, ocularis, is Latin for eye and refers to the eye-like reniform spot on each forewing.

External links
A revision of the genus Hypotrix Guenée in North America with descriptions of four new species and a new genus (Lepidoptera, Noctuidae, Noctuinae, Eriopygini)
mothphotographersgroup

Hypotrix
Moths described in 2010